Ayotunde Ganiyu Anifowoshe (born 3 February 1985 in Niamey) is a Nigerien footballer who plays for Kwara United F.C.

Career
Anifowoshe played for Göyazan Qazax during the 2004–05 and 2005–06 Azerbaijan season's and for Olimpik Baku during the 2006–07 season.

Career statistics

References

1985 births
Living people
Nigerien footballers
Expatriate footballers in Azerbaijan
AZAL PFK players
Nigerien expatriate sportspeople in Nigeria
Sunshine Stars F.C. players
Expatriate footballers in Nigeria
Nigerien expatriate footballers
People from Niamey
Association football forwards